Tryggve Olafsson (Old Norse: Tryggvi Óláfsson, Norwegian: Tryggve Olavsson) (born 928 in Ringerike, died  963 in Sotnes, Bohuslän, Västra Götaland, Sweden) was king of Viken, Norway (Vingulmark and Rånrike).

Biography
Tryggve Olafsson was the son of Olaf Haraldsson, king of Vestfold and Vingulmark, and grandson of King Harald Fairhair. According to the Heimskringla, Tryggve performed Viking expeditions in Ireland and Scotland. In 946 King Haakon I of Norway went north, and set Tryggve to defend Viken against his enemies in the south. He also gave him all that he could reconquer of land in the area which the summer before, King Haakon had subjected to payment of taxes. Historically the Danish kings had dominion over the area.

King Haakon was mortally wounded at the Battle of Fitjar in an engagement with Eirik’s sons. After Haakon's death, Harald Greycloak, third son of Eirik Bloodaxe, jointly with his brothers became kings of Norway. Tryggve was subsequently killed by Harald Greycloak as part of Harald's effort to establish his own rule over Norway. Reportedly Tryggve was lured into a trap.

His wife, the widow with issue of Lodin fra Viken (Viken, ca. 940 -), Magnat/Kjøpmann i Viken, Astrid Eiriksdatter (Obrestad, Nærbø, Rogaland, ca. 925 - Ringerike, 968), daughter of Eirik Bjodaskalle Kåresson, av Obrestad (Obrestad på Jæren, Hå, Rogaland, 902 - Obrestad på Jæren, Hå, Rogaland, 964) and wife, by whom he already had two daughters, Ingeborg Tryggvesdotter (ca. 960 - Kiev, 1019), wife of Ragnvald "the Old" Ulfsson (Västergötland, aft. 948 - executed by son-in-law after watching forced "marriage" of daughter, Västergötland, ca. 1045), Jarl av Västergötland, "Jarl i Västergötland & Aldeigjuborg, Ryssland", with issue, and Astrid Tryggvesdotter (Ringerike, Buskerud, ca. 962 - Sola, Rogaland, ca. 1006), wife of Erling Skjalgsson, på Sola (Sola, Rogaland, 975 - Boknafjorden (Falt I Slaget Mot Olav Den Hellige På Boknafjorden), 21 December 1028, bur. Sola, Rogaland), "Rygekongen", Herse/Høvding i Rogaland, with issue, gave birth to their only son shortly after his killing. Tryggve's son, Olaf Tryggvason, later became king of Norway, and his daughter Ingeborg Tryggvasdotter married Ragnvald Ulfsson, the Jarl of Västergötland and later the ruler of Staraja Ladoga.

References

Norwegian petty kings
963 deaths
Year of birth unknown
928 births